The 1940–41 Montreal Canadiens season was the 32nd season in club history. The team placed sixth in the regular season to qualify for the playoffs. The Canadiens lost in the quarter-finals against Chicago Black Hawks.

Off-season
During the off-season, Dick Irvin was hired as the new coach of the team. Irvin had previously been the coach of the Toronto Maple Leafs. Maple Leafs' owner Conn Smythe, who wanted to hire Hap Day, suggested Irvin to the Canadiens.

Regular season
Rookie Johnny Quilty led the team in scoring and the team increased its wins total to 16 from 10 in the previous season.

Final standings

Record vs. opponents

Playoffs
The Canadiens qualified for the playoffs and played the Chicago Black Hawks. The Black Hawks won the best-of-three series in three games, two games to one.

Schedule and results

Player statistics

Regular season
Scoring

Goaltending

Playoffs
Scoring

Goaltending

Awards and records
 Calder Memorial Trophy : Johnny Quilty

Transactions

See also
 1940–41 NHL season

References

External links
Canadiens on Hockey Database
Canadiens on NHL Reference

Montreal Canadiens seasons
Montreal
Montreal